Lieshan District is a district of Anhui Province, China. It is under the administration of Huaibei city.

Administrative divisions
In the present, Lieshan District has 4 subdistricts and 3 towns.
4 Subdistricts
 Yangzhuang
 Renlou
 Linhaitong
 Baishan

3 Towns
 Songtuan
 Lieshan
 Gurao

References

Huaibei